The Caledonian Railway 944 Class were 4-6-2T passenger tank locomotives designed by William Pickersgill and built in 1917, at the North British Locomotive Company's Hyde Park Works in Glasgow. They were the Caledonian Railway's only pacific-type.

Overview
Although the Caledonian Railway built a long and successful series of small 0-4-4T passenger tank engines, the twelve locomotives of the 944 Class were the only large passenger tanks operated by the company. They shared much of their design with the contemporary 60 Class 4-6-0s.  They were originally used on the Inverclyde Line and so gained the nickname 'Wemyss Bay Pugs' amongst enginemen.

The locomotives passed into the ownership of the London, Midland and Scottish Railway (LMS) upon its formation in 1923, and were repainted from Caledonian blue into LMS crimson lake livery, although within a few years this gave way to lined black livery. They were later displaced from the Inverclyde line by LMS Fowler and Fairburn 2-6-4Ts and by the time of nationalisation in 1948, the surviving locomotives were all allocated to Beattock shed, primarily for banking duties on Beattock Summit. They were all withdrawn and scrapped between 1946 and 1953.

Numbering and Locomotive Histories

sources: BritishSteam, Longworth (2005) p167

References

944 Class
4-6-2T locomotives
NBL locomotives
Railway locomotives introduced in 1917
Standard gauge steam locomotives of Great Britain
Scrapped locomotives